Nam Et-Phou Louey National Protected Area (NPA) is a protected area in northern Laos, covering  in three provinces: Houaphan, Luang Prabang, and Xieng Khouang. The park includes a  core area where human access and wildlife harvest is prohibited and a 2,950 km2 buffer area where pre-existing villages are allocated land for subsistence living.  

The park consists mainly of mountains and hills, with elevations ranging between 336 and 2257 metres. The area is the source of many rivers. It is named after the Nam Et River and Phou Louey Mountain ('Forever Mountain'). The area has a high level of biodiversity and endangered species including tiger, leopard, clouded leopard, Asian golden cat, marbled cat, civet, gaur, Sambar deer, white-cheeked gibbon, sun bear, black bear, Asian elephant, dhole, hornbill and three species of otter. As from 2013 on there is no proof of tigers in the park anymore which makes them extinct in entire Laos. Leopards vanished from the park even earlier.

Villagers living in the Nam Et-Phou Louey National Park include Tai Dam, Tai Daeng, Tai Kao, Tai Puan, Tai Lue, Tai Yuan, Khmu, Hmong Kao, Hmong Lai, and Yao.

Viengthong, a small town in Houaphan Province, is the site of the Nam Et-Phou Louey NPA headquarters and visitor centre, where tours into the park can be organised. The town has basic accommodation and a handful of restaurants. There are many biking and walking trails, as well as hot springs.

Ecotourism
The only access for visitors to see the protected area is by doing a tour organized by the area ecotourism unit.

Nam Nern Night Safari boat tour (24-hour overnight tour) — This innovative and adventurous journey by traditional long-tail boat offers nature activities that include bird watching, wildlife tracking, nighttime wildlife spotting, medicinal plant exploration, and moderate hiking. This tour won the prestigious ‘World Responsible Tourism Award’ at the World Travel Mart in London, England, in 2013 and 2014.

Trekking Tours The Nests (two or three days) is a family-friendly hike with overnights in cozy spherical baskets hanging from the trees. The trip is perfect to enjoy wildlife viewing from the observation tower (under construction) at the nearby Poung Nyied salt lick, which attracts animals such as the rare Sambar deer from far and wide.

Trekking Tours Cloud Forest Climb (four or five days including ‘The Nests’) is a hiking trail to the summit of Phou Louey to one of the few cloud forests in the region. It is an option for the more adventurous. The hike goes through the evergreen forest and offers a rare opportunity to track wild species such as white-cheeked gibbon, leopards, bears and wild dogs using camera traps, which are set up along the trail and maintained by tourists.

For more information contact the protected area headquarters.

See also
Protected areas of Laos

References

External links
Ecotourism Laos - Protected Areas
 Nam Et-Phou Louey NPA

Geography of Houaphanh province
Geography of Luang Prabang province
Geography of Xiangkhouang province
Tourist attractions in Laos
National Biodiversity Conservation Areas